The Long Way Home is a 1997 American documentary film directed by Mark Jonathan Harris. It depicts the plight of Jewish refugees after World War II that contributed to the creation of the State of Israel.

The film's emphasis is on the pitiful conditions for Jewish refugees in Europe after the war, as antisemitism was still rife and poverty was common. It also shows how emigration to the British Mandate of Palestine became a goal for many, but that British immigration rules often resulted in them being detained in camps in Cyprus. The eventual formation of the State of Israel is then shown, with emphasis on the debates in the White House between Palestinian Jews, President Harry S. Truman, and the United Nations.

The Long Way Home is narrated by Morgan Freeman and features the voices of Edward Asner, Sean Astin, Martin Landau, Miriam Margolyes, David Paymer, Nina Siemaszko, Helen Slater, and Michael York. The film won the Academy Award for Best Documentary Feature in 1998.

See also 
List of Holocaust films

References

External links
The Long Way Home at Moriah Films

1997 films
1997 documentary films
American black-and-white films
American documentary films
Best Documentary Feature Academy Award winners
Films directed by Mark Jonathan Harris
Films scored by Lee Holdridge
Documentary films about Jews and Judaism
Documentary films about refugees
Documentary films about historical events
Documentary films about Israel
Simon Wiesenthal Center
1990s English-language films
1990s American films